Lehmann's poison frog or the red-banded poison frog (Oophaga lehmanni) is a species of frogs in the family Dendrobatidae endemic to a small part of western Colombia. Its natural habitats are submontane tropical rainforests. It is threatened by habitat loss and collection for the pet trade, and the IUCN lists it as being "critically endangered". It was named after Colombian conservation biologist Federico Carlos Lehmann.

Description
Lehmann's poison frog has a smooth skin and exhibits aposematic colouration, which warns predators that it is inedible. There are red, orange and yellow morphs of this frog. The background colour is black or dark brown which contrasts with the two bright, broad bands of colour round the body and further coloured bands on the limbs. The first toe is shorter than the second and the toes of males have silver tips.

It is very similar in appearance to the harlequin poison frog (Oophaga histrionicus), a species with which it can hybridise, and there is ongoing debate as to whether it is in fact a separate species. There are distinct differences in the calls of the males between northern and southern populations.

Distribution
Lehmann's poison frog is endemic to Colombia where it is found in tropical forests in the drainage of the Anchicayá River to the west of Dagua in Valle del Cauca Department, as well as in one locality in Chocó Department, all on the slopes of the Cordillera Occidental.

Biology
Lehmann's poison frog is diurnal and primarily feeds on small insects. It is found on the forest floor and in low vegetation. Breeding takes place at the end of the rainy season. The male chooses a suitable location and calls repeatedly to attract a female. She deposits a small number of large eggs on leaves up to 120 cm (4 ft) above the forest floor where the male fertilises them. He keeps them moist and rotates them occasionally and after two to four weeks he carries them on his back and deposits them singly in small temporary water pools in such places as hollows in trees, water-filled bromeliad rosettes and bamboo stalks. Here the tadpoles develop and the female periodically deposits unfertilised eggs in the water on which they feed. If there are several tadpoles in any water body, cannibalism may occur.

In the wild, Lehmann's poison frog is toxic, but in captivity it loses its toxicity because this is derived from its diet.

Status
Lehmann's poison frog is only found in a very small area of Colombia. It is fully protected in its native country, considered critically endangered by the IUCN and listed on CITES Appendix II. Once a common species in its tiny range, recent surveys have found that it is now very rare. Threats to its survival are the degradation of its habitat due to timber extraction and illegal agriculture, and collection for the pet trade. It is present in the Parque Nacional Natural Farallones de Cali. In an attempt of countering the continued illegal collection of wild individuals, a farm that breeds this species and other Colombian poison frogs in captivity has been started in Colombia, both providing legal frogs for the pet market (instead of illegal wild caught) and an income for the local community.

References

Oophaga
Poison dart frogs
Amphibians described in 1976
Amphibians of Colombia
Endemic fauna of Colombia
Taxonomy articles created by Polbot